Vilayer is the debut album by the band Kerretta, released in 2009, and nominated for the New Zealand equivalent of the Mercury Prize, The Taite Music Award.Track listingSleepersMaven FadeThe Secret Is MomentumDinshahThe Square OutsideNest Of SpiesWhite LieBone Amber Reigns''

External links 
   Kerretta Bandcamp page

2009 albums
Kerretta albums